

1974

See also 
 1974 in Australia
 1974 in Australian television

References

External links 
 Australian film at the Internet Movie Database

1974
Australia
Films